William Hervey, 1st Baron Hervey (c.1565 – July 1642), was an English soldier and politician who sat in the House of Commons between 1601 and 1611.

Hervey was the son of  Henry Hervey and his wife Jane Thomas, daughter of John Thomas, of Llanvihangell. He was grandon of Sir Nicholas Hervey, of Ickworth, Suffolk. He was in service against the Spanish Armada and was knighted at Cadiz by the Earl of Essex on 27 June 1596. He served afterwards in Ireland.

In 1601, Hervey was elected Member of Parliament for Horsham. He was elected MP for Petersfield in 1604. He was created baronet of St Martin-in-the-Fields on 31 May 1619. On 5 August 1620, he was created Baron Hervey of Rosse, County Wexford. He was created Baron Hervey of Kidbrooke, Kent, on 27 February 1628. The baronetcy merged into these peerages and  continued until his  death in 1642, when all his other honours became extinct.

Hervey married  firstly, in May 1597, Mary, dowager Countess of Southampton, widow of Sir Thomas Heneage, and formerly of Henry Wriothesley, 2nd Earl of Southampton, and daughter of Anthony Browne, 1st Viscount Montagu, by his first wife, Jane Radcliffe, daughter of Robert Radcliffe, 1st Earl of Sussex. They had no issue and she died in 1607. He married secondly on 5 February 1607, Cordell Annesley, daughter of Brian Annesley, of Lee and Kidbrooke, Kent, gentleman-pensioner, and his wife Audrey Tirrell, daughter of Tirrell, of Essex, warden of the Fleet Prison.

As the step-father of the Earl of Southampton, Hervey has been suggested as one of several candidates to be the "Mr W. H." of Shakespeare's sonnets and has also been proposed as their transmitter for publication.

References

1500s births
Year of birth missing
1642 deaths
English MPs 1601
English MPs 1604–1611
English people of the Anglo-Spanish War (1585–1604)
Barons Hervey
Barons in the Peerage of Ireland
Barons in the Peerage of England
Peers of Ireland created by James I
Peers of England created by Charles I